Beechland, near Taylorsville, Kentucky, was built in 1804.  It was built by Jacob Yoder and has also been known as Jacob Yoder House.  The listing included four contributing buildings.

Jacob Yoder was a Revolutionary War soldier and innovative merchant-trader, was "the first entrepreneur to take a load of goods down the Ohio and Mississippi Rivers on a flat boat from Pennsylvania to New Orleans."

See also
Beechland (Jeffersontown, Kentucky), built in 1812 and also NRHP-listed

References

National Register of Historic Places in Spencer County, Kentucky
Houses completed in 1804
1804 establishments in Kentucky
Houses on the National Register of Historic Places in Kentucky